Magnus Breitenmoser (born 6 August 1998) is a Swiss professional footballer who plays as a midfielder for Finnish club AC Oulu on loan from FC Thun.

Professional career
On 13 March 2020, Breitenmoser signed a professional contract with FC Thun. Breitenmoser made his professional debut with Thun in a 5-1 Swiss Super League win over Servette FC on 22 July 2020.

International career
Breitenmoser was born in Switzerland to a Swiss father and Kenyan mother. He is a youth international for Switzerland.

References

External links
 
 SFL Profile

1998 births
Living people
People from Wil
Swiss men's footballers
Switzerland youth international footballers
Swiss people of Kenyan descent
Association football midfielders
FC Thun players
FC Schaffhausen players
FC Wil players
AC Oulu players
Swiss Super League players
Swiss Challenge League players
Veikkausliiga players
Swiss expatriate footballers
Expatriate footballers in Finland
Swiss expatriate sportspeople in Finland
Sportspeople from the canton of St. Gallen